Brian Keirstead is a Canadian politician, who was elected to the Legislative Assembly of New Brunswick in the 2014 provincial election. He represented the electoral district of Albert as a member of the Progressive Conservatives from 2014 to 2018.

References

Living people
Progressive Conservative Party of New Brunswick MLAs
People from Albert County, New Brunswick
21st-century Canadian politicians
Year of birth missing (living people)